Mary Gallegos is an American Republican politician who served in the Oregon House of Representatives from 2003 until 2005.

Career
Gallegos was first elected to the legislature in 2002, defeating Democrat Chuck Riley. The 29th district covers the cities of Forest Grove and Cornelius, and part of Hillsboro. She lost reelection to Riley in 2004.

References

Living people
21st-century American women politicians
21st-century American politicians
Date of birth missing (living people)
Republican Party members of the Oregon House of Representatives
People from Cornelius, Oregon
Place of birth missing (living people)
Women state legislators in Oregon
Year of birth missing (living people)